Argyle Airport  is a privately owned, public use airport in  Washington County, New York, United States. It is located off of NY Route 40 two nautical miles (4 km) northeast of the central business district of Argyle, a village in the Town of Argyle.

Facilities and aircraft 
Argyle Airport covers an area of 50 acres (20 ha) at an elevation of 330 feet (101 m) above mean sea level. It has one runway designated 3/21 with a turf surface measuring 2,400 by 87 feet (732 × 27 m).

For the 12-month period ending June 19, 2018, the airport had 20,000 aircraft operations, an average of 54 per day: 95% general aviation and 5% military. At that time there were 32 aircraft based at this airport: 88% single-engine, 9% ultralight, and 3% helicopter.

References

External links 
 Aerial image as of April 1995 from USGS The National Map

Airports in New York (state)
Transportation buildings and structures in Washington County, New York